The following is a discography for Megumi Nakajima.

Albums 

 I Love You [2010.06.09]
 Be With You [2012.03.07]
 Thank You [2014.02.26]
 Curiosity [2018.02.14]
 Lovely train
 Green diary [2021.02.03]

Singles

Seikan Hikō 

"Seikan Hikō" was the first single from Megumi Nakajima as Ranka Lee's character, and the debut song of Ranka in the series; contains two cover of Lynn Minmay (Mari Iijima); Ai Oboete Imasu ka (reproduced in deculture edition chapter and 12 of the series as ending teme and 18 as insert song) and Watashi no Kare wa Pilot (insert song chapter 4 Miss Macross), also contains own songs of Megumi = Ranka as Neko Nikki (insert song in chapters 9 and 12, and fifth ending theme in chapter 11). This single debuted at number 5 on Oricon Dailies

Track listing

Lion 

"Lion" was the second single from Megumi Nakajima as Ranka Lee also possesses the songs: Lion who plays with May'n (third opening of the series, chapters 18 to 24) and Northern Cross was the seventh song to appear as the ending theme and the second most predominant (Chapters 16, 17, 18, 22, 23 and 24)

Track listing

Ranka to Bobby no SMS Shōtai no Uta Nado. 

"Ranka to Bobby no SMS Shōtai no Uta Nado" is the third single from Megumi Nakajima as Ranka, was released after the conclusion of the Macross Frontier TV series, and features the participation of Kenta Miyake = Bobby Margot, and performs a cover of the songs SMS Shōtai no Uta in duet (sung by several voice actors in the anime), and a cover of Watashi no Kare wa Pilot performed by Bobby (originally performed by Mari Iijima). Arrangements: track1=Yoko Kanno, track2=Yoko Kanno, Hisaaki Hokari

Tenshi ni Naritai 

 is her fourth single, but was the first launched by Nakajima Megumi who was not represented by an anime character; prior to its release, released as digital download songs Tenshi ni Naritai, Pine and Be Myself in Japan mora stores. Tenshi ni Naritai as was the most "requested", this was chosen as the A-side of the CD, the others spent the B-side. When it published the single also included a new song "(Kari) Dajaren no Outa". This single debuted at number 12 on Oricon Dailies.

Nostalgia 

Nostalgia was her second single as Nakajima Megumi and the fifth of her career, this included two original songs of Mamegu (Nostalgia and Shining on), and a Mari Iijima's cover of the song Tenshi no Enogu, who was chosen by the fans (with 1,058 votes) in February 2009, in a special site showed up on the Macross Frontier official website which featured a poll for Macross, which song do you want covered by Ranka Lee?, which had other songs, such as My Friends (second with 721 votes),  (in third place with 508 votes), Voices (in fourth place with 431 votes) and  [Little White Dragon] in last place with 355 votes. Nostalgia and Tenshi ni Naritai singles was used as the theme song for the 2008 adaption of the drama Daisuki! Itsutsugo.
Following the launch of the single, this was accompanied by a DVD containing two tracks, 1.Making and 2. [I Wanna Be an Angel] (PV). This single debuted at # 10 on Oricon Dailies.

No Limit 

"No Limit" was the first single from the group Eclipse of the Basquash! series integrating by: Rouge (Haruka Tomatsu), Violette (Saori Hayami) and Citron (Nakajima Megumi) as the leader. And the sixth single from Megumi; nO limiT was used as the opening theme (episodes 2 to 13 and 22 as the insert song), and moon pasport was used as insert song in the same anime. Arrangements: track1=Yoshihiro Kusano, track2=Funta7

Running on 

Running on is the seventh single from Megumi and second of the group Eclipse of the Basquash! series, it contains the songs Running on (which was used as insert song), and also features solo versions of their debut single, "No Limit". This solo versions sparked many disputes between the followers of the voice actors, by reason of who was the best singer, but not step over. Arrangements: track1= Okumoto Akira, track2=Yoshihiro Kusano

Futari no Yakusoku 

 (Our Promise) was the last single released by Eclipse, and the eighth of Nakajima, presents the songs Futari no Yakusoku that was used as the ending theme (chapters 13 to 23 and 25-26), and the song Hoshi Watari performed only by Mamegu (Citron), and this was used as ending theme in chapter 24, when Dan and his friends travel to the moon by the power of the ruins of the legend with this song. Arrangements: track1=Yoshihiro Kusano, track2=Conisch

One Way Ryō Omoi 

 (One Way Love) is the second single of the series Kämpfer, but the ninth of Megumi, involved in this CD Marina Inoue (as Seno Natsuru) and Megumi Nakajima (as Sakura Kaede), the song One Ryō Omoi Way is used as the ending theme of the series, the second track is Tatakae Mora Rhythm and the third track track One Way Ryō Omoi -unstoppable delusion ≒ impulse-, is a remix arranged by Yoshihisa xxyoshixx Fujita. Arrangements: track1=Takahiro Ando, track2=Akira Takada

Jellyfish no Kokuhaku 

 (Confession of a Jellyfish) is the third single from Megumi Nakajima who is not represented by an anime character, and tenth in her career; presents the songs Jellyfish no Kokuhaku used as ending theme in the Kobato series and Hi no Ataru Heya. This single debuted at number 12 on Oricon Dailies.

CM Ranka 

 is the fourth single from Megumi Nakajima as Ranka Lee, but eleven of her career, this single contains songs sung by Megumi in the movie Gekijōban Macross Frontier: Itsuwari no Utahime, the song Sō Da Yo was used as ending theme of the movie, from second to seventh track are songs of commercials sung by Ranka in the movie, except Ninjin loves you yeah!. The eighth track on the CD was confirmed on the official website of Flying Dog. The song "Family Mart Cosmos" is used in Family Mart convenience stores in addition to the film. This single debuted at number 5 on Oricon Dailies

Track listing

Melody 

 is the fourth single from Megumi Nakajima who is not represented by an anime character, and the twelfth in her career; presents the song Melody used as ending theme to first volume of OVA Tamayura series, and the songs Natsudori used as second ending theme and Naisho no Hanashi used as insert song.

Hōkago Overflow 

 is the second single release from Ranka Lee of anime series "Macross Frontier." Includes B-side "Get it on-flying rock" sung with Sheryl, Hōkago Overflow is the second official single of Ranka after Seikan Hikō, this song has been used for promotion the new film Gekijōban Macross F: Sayonara no Tsubasa.

Track listing

Track listing

Digital downloads 
 Be Myself (2008.11.08)
  (2008.11.08)
  [I Wanna Be an Angel] (2008.11.08)
  [I Wanna Be an Angel] (2009.07.01)
 Shining on Live ver. (2009.07.01)
 Raspberry Kiss (2009.07.08)

Compilations

Macross Frontier O.S.T.1 Nyan FRO. 

 What 'bout my star?@Formo (duet with May'n)
 
  [Carrots Loves you yeah!]
  ["Super Dimension Restaurant Nyan Nyan" CM Song (Ranka Version)]
  [Aimo ~ Bird Human]

Macross Frontier O.S.T.2 Nyan TRA☆ 

  (duet with May'n)
  [Your Sound]
  [Interstellar Flight]
  [Do You Remember Love? ~ bless the little queen]
  [Azure Ether]
 
  (with May'n and Maaya Sakamoto)

Macross Frontier Vocal Collection Nyan Tama 

 Disc 1
 What 'bout my star?@Formo (duet with May'n)
 
  [Diamond Crevasse ~ In the Park View] (duet with May'n)
  (duet with May'n)
  ["Super Dimension Restaurant Nyan Nyan" CM Song (Ranka Version)]
  [Interstellar Flight]
  [My Boyfriend is a Pilot]
  [Cat Diary]
  [Carrots Loves you yeah!]
 
  [Aimo ~ Bird Human]
  [Do You Remember Love?]
 Disc 2
  (duet with May'n)
  (duet with May'n)
  [Brera and Little Ranka's Aimo]
  [Your Sound]
  [Azure Ether]
  [Do You Remember Love? ~ bless the little queen]
  [Nyan Nyan Special Service Medley (Special Serving)] (with May'n and Maaya Sakamoto)
  (duet with May'n)
  [Mother and Little Ranka's Aimo] (duet with Maaya Sakamoto)

Idol Attack! 

  [Rainbow's Brace] (with Haruka Tomatsu / Saori Hayami)
 Cosmos
 After the Heart Rain
 No Limit (album-mix) (with Haruka Tomatsu / Saori Hayami)
 No Limit (sadness x Rouge edit) (with Haruka Tomatsu / Saori Hayami)

Iki o Shiteru Kanjiteiru 

  [I'm Breathing, I'm Feeling] (with Mari Iijima, Fire Bomber and May'n)
 Iki o Shiteru Kanjiteiru (TV Mix)

Kämpfer Character Song Album 

  [A Make-up Fall in Love]
 Sugao de Fall in Love (Instrumental)

References

Discographies of Japanese artists